Kabir Prince Bello, born July 21, 1983 is a Nigerian football striker who last played for PSPS Pekanbaru in the Indonesian Super League. He also had stints with Sepahan previously, and played 2 games in FIFA Club World Cup 2007 with them.

Personal life 
He is a Convert to Shi'a Islam.

References

External links
 Profile in Virtus International
 Profile in Liga Indonesia Official Website 

1983 births
Living people
Sepahan Novin players
Nigerian footballers
Association football forwards
Sepahan S.C. footballers
Expatriate footballers in Iran
Expatriate footballers in Indonesia
Nigerian Shia Muslims
Converts to Shia Islam from Sunni Islam
Liga 1 (Indonesia) players
PSPS Pekanbaru players
Jasper United F.C. players